Zak Sally is an American musician and comic artist. He was the bass guitarist for the bands Low (1995 to 2004) and Enemymine (1998 to 2000) and is the singer and guitar player in The Hand. Sally is from Duluth, Minnesota, and owns and operates his own press, La Mano, in Minneapolis. La Mano serves as a publisher for Sally's works as well as those of other comic artists, including John Porcellino and William Schaff. Sally is also a comics art professor at the Minneapolis College of Art and Design.

In July 2009, it was reported that Sally was selling Low album artwork on eBay to raise money to fund a new solo album. The album, Fear of Song, was released by La Mano in 2009.

Works
 Like a Dog (2009), published by Fantagraphics Books (collects Recidivist #1–2 and more)
 Sammy the Mouse Vol. 1 (2007), published by Fantagraphics Books
 Sammy the Mouse Vol. 2 (2008), published by Uncivilized Books
 Mome (Fall 2006 and Fall 2007)
 Recidivist 3 (2006) and Recidivist IV (2015), published by La Mano

In pop culture
 Sally appears as a character in Jeffrey Brown's autobiographical graphic-novel Little Things.
 Sally is the subject of the song "Minneapolis" by That Dog.
 Sally has a cameo in the movie Shopgirl, as a member of the band Hot Tears.

References

External links
Sally's La Mano Press website

Musicians from Duluth, Minnesota
Year of birth missing (living people)
Living people
Artists from Minnesota